The 2015–16 Syed Mushtaq Ali Trophy is the seventh season of the Syed Mushtaq Ali Trophy, a domestic Twenty20 cricket tournament in India. There are 27 domestic cricket teams competing, divided into 4 groups.

Teams 
The following 6 teams have been drafted into drafted in Group D.
 Mumbai
 Odisha (host)
 Karnataka
 Services
 Uttar Pradesh
 Maharashtra

Fixtures

Round 1

Round 2

Round 3

Round 4

Round 5

References 

Syed Mushtaq Ali Trophy Group D
Syed Mushtaq Ali Trophy Group D